Percy Jackson's Greek Gods is a collection of short stories about Greek mythology as narrated by Percy Jackson. It was written by Rick Riordan and was released on August 19, 2014. It features Percy Jackson giving his own take on the Greek myths in a humorous way.

The book is titled Percy Jackson and the Greek Gods in the U.K. and much of the Commonwealth of Nations. It is generally published under the Puffin Books imprint of Penguin Group and may be presented as Percy Jackson and the Olympians, volume 6. (The Olympians novels are commonly titled Percy Jackson and the Lightning Thief rather than The Lightning Thief, and so on.)

Development

On April 21, 2013, Rick Riordan announced on his Twitter account that he was writing a new book based on the stories of Greek mythology from Percy Jackson's point of view. He later confirmed this in his blog. While on tour for The House of Hades Rick Riordan also revealed that the book is 450 pages long, with illustrations throughout. It was released on August 19, 2014. John Rocco, the illustrator of the book, announced that there will be 60 full-color paintings drawn by him in the book, and gave a sneak peek of one, depicting Hades kidnapping Persephone.

During the Blood of Olympus tour, Rick Riordan announced a sequel, titled Percy Jackson's Greek Heroes, to be released on August 18, 2015.

Plot

Percy Jackson adds his own viewpoint to the Greek myths. Here he presents an introduction to Greek mythology and the 12 major gods and goddesses. With 19 chapters, this includes a variety of stories, from the early tales of Gaea and the Titans to individual tales about the gods readers, encountered in the Camp Half-Blood chronicles. Percy's irreverent voice is evident from titles such as "Hera Gets a Little Cuckoo," "Zeus Kills Everyone," "Athena Adopts a Handkerchief," and "Artemis Unleashes the Death Pig," and the stories are told in his voice with his distinctive, sarcastic yet humorous perspective.

Characters

Titans
 Prometheus
 Kronos
 Themis
 Koios
 Oceanus
 Hyperion
 Iapetus
 Krios
 Rhea
 Metis
 Theia
 Tethys
 Phoebe
 Leto
 Maia
 Mnemosyne
 Helios
 Selene
 Atlas
 Epimetheus

Gods
 Hades one of chapters are about him
 Hecateis a main character in one of the chapters
 Persephoneone of the chapters are about her
 Makaria
 Zeus one of the chapters are about him
 Hera one of the chapters are about her
 Poseidonone of the chapters are about him
 Dionysusone of the chapters are about him
 Athenaone of the chapters are about her
 Demeterone of the chapters are about her
 Arion
 Artemisone of the chapter are about her
 Apolloone of the chapters are about him
 The Muses
 Aphroditeone of the chapters are about her
 Eros
 Thanatos
 Hebe
 Eileithyia
 Hephaestusone of the chapters are about him
 Harmonia
 Aresone of the chapters are about him
 Hermesone of the chapters are about him
 Aegipan
 Hestiaone of the chapters are about her
 Fates
 The three Horai
 Triton
 Rhodes
 Triptolemus
 Priapus
 Gaiais a main character in some of the chapters
 Nemesis

Nature Spirits (nymphs, satyrs, etc.)
 Nereids
 Amphitrite
 Leuke
 Dryads
 Naiads
 Chelone
 Minthe
 Pallas
 Kallisto
 Satyrs
 Ampelos
 Marsyas
 Delos

Demigods
 Erichthonios
 Tantarus
 Alcippe
 Halirrhothius
 Tityus
 Aeneas
 Pluotos
 Achilles
 Asclepius 
 Aeacus
 Arcas
 Minos
 Percy Jackson
 Annabeth Chase
 Piper McLean
 Jason Grace
 Leo Valdez
 Frank Zhang
 Hazel Levesque

Hinted/Referenced
 Hercules
 Orpheus
 Psyche
 Leda
 Beroe
Achilles
 Reyna's dogs

References

External links

 Percy Jackson and the Olympians series site from publisher Disney (readriordan.com)
 Percy Jackson at Rick Riordan Myth Master from Penguin Books (UK)
 

2014 short story collections
Percy Jackson & the Olympians
2014 children's books